"Star 69" (also known as "Star 69 (What the F**k)") is a song by English electronic music producer Fatboy Slim, released on 23 April 2001 as the second single from his third studio album Halfway Between the Gutter and the Stars (2000). It was released as a double A-side single with "Weapon of Choice", as well as its own standalone release.

The song peaked at number 10 on the UK Singles Chart and reached the top 40 in Australia, Finland, and Ireland. It was later sampled by Katy Perry and Nicki Minaj on their 2017 collaboration "Swish Swish". Despite being promoted as a single, "Star 69" was omitted from edited versions of Halfway Between the Gutter and the Stars due to its frequent looping of an expletive.

Background 
The vocals on the song consist almost entirely of the repeating verse, "They know what is what, but they don't know what is what, they just strut. What the fuck?", sampled from "I Get Deep" by Roland Clark, which was also used on Fatboy Slim's song "Song for Shelter".

A radio edit of the track exists with the word "fuck" taken out. "Star 69" is popular with DJs and has often been remixed and used in mashups due to the vocal hook.

The song is included in the compilation CD Soundtrack 1: The Definitive Xbox Compilation, a compilation CD released in Canada to promote the first Xbox console.

Track listing 
CD

12-inch vinyl

Charts 
"Star 69" / "Weapon of Choice"

"Year-end charts"

"Star 69"

 1 – censored version

Release history

References

Fatboy Slim songs
2000 songs
2001 singles
Astralwerks singles
Music based on Dune (franchise)
Music videos directed by Spike Jonze
Songs written by Norman Cook
Skint Records singles
UK Independent Singles Chart number-one singles